At least two ships, both East Indiamen of the East India Company (EIC), have borne the name Earl of Abergavenny, named for Henry Nevill, 2nd Earl of Abergavenny:

 - launched in 1789 and made two trips for the EIC before the Royal Navy bought her in 1795 and named her HMS Abergavenny; the Navy sold her in 1807.
  - launched in 1796 and wrecked in 1805.

Ships of the British East India Company
Age of Sail merchant ships
Merchant ships of the United Kingdom
Ship names